Harry Bailey (1922–1985) was an Australian psychiatrist.

Harry Bailey may also refer to:
H. E. Bailey (died 1976), Oklahoma politician
Harry Bailey (footballer) (1870–1930), footballer for Leicester Fosse
Harry Paul Bailey (1913–1979), professor of earth sciences
Harry Bailey (Coronation Street)
The Host (Canterbury Tales), or Harry Bailey, a character in Geoffrey Chaucer's poem The Canterbury Tales
Harry Bailey, younger brother of the protagonist in the movie It's a Wonderful Life

See also
Henry Bailey (disambiguation)
Sir Harold Walter Bailey (1899–1996), English linguist